A large language model (LLM) is a language model consisting of a neural network with many parameters (typically billions of weights or more), trained on large quantities of unlabelled text using self-supervised learning. LLMs emerged around 2018 and perform well at a wide variety of tasks. This has shifted the focus of natural language processing research away from the previous paradigm of training specialized supervised models for specific tasks.

Properties
Though the term large language model has no formal definition, it generally refers to deep learning models having a parameter count on the order of billions or more. LLMs are general purpose models which excel at a wide range of tasks, as opposed to being trained for one specific task (such as sentiment analysis, named entity recognition, or mathematical reasoning). Though trained on simple tasks along the lines of predicting the next word in a sentence, neural language models with sufficient training and parameter counts are found to capture much of the syntax and semantics of human language. In addition, large language models demonstrate considerable general knowledge about the world, and are able to "memorize" a great quantity of facts during training.

Hallucinations 

In artificial intelligence in general, and in large language models in particular, a "hallucination" is a confident response that does not seem to be justified by the model's training data.

Emergent abilities 

Unpredictable abilities that were observed in large language models but that were not present in a simpler models are usually called "emergent abilities". Researchers note that such abilities "cannot be predicted simply by extrapolating the performance of smaller models". Hundreds of emergent abilities were already described, examples include multi-step arithmetic, taking college-level exams, identifying the intended meaning of a word, chain-of-thought prompting, decoding the International Phonetic Alphabet, unscrambling a word’s letters, identifying offensive content in paragraphs of Hinglish (a combination of Hindi and English), and generating a similar English equivalent of Kiswahili proverbs.

Architecture and training
Large language models have most commonly used the transformer architecture, which, since 2018, has become the standard deep learning technique for sequential data (previously, recurrent architectures such as the LSTM were most common). LLMs are trained in an unsupervised manner on unannotated text. A left-to-right transformer is trained to maximize the probability assigned to the next word in the training data, given the previous context. Alternatively, an LLM may use a bidirectional transformer (as in the example of BERT), which assigns a probability distribution over words given access to both preceding and following context. In addition to the task of predicting the next word or "filling in the blanks", LLMs may be trained on auxiliary tasks which test their understanding of the data distribution such as Next Sentence Prediction (NSP), in which pairs of sentences are presented and the model must predict whether they appear side-by-side in the training corpus.

The earliest LLMs were trained on corpora having on the order of billions of words. The initial version of GPT was trained in 2018 on BookCorpus, consisting of 985 million words. In the same year, BERT was trained on a combination of BookCorpus and English Wikipedia, totalling 3.3 billion words. In the years since then, training corpora for LLMs have increased by orders of magnitude, reaching up to hundreds of billions or trillions of tokens.

LLMs are computationally expensive to train. A 2020 study estimated the cost of training a 1.5 billion parameter model (1-2 orders of magnitude smaller than the state of the art at the time) at $1.6 million.

A 2020 analysis found that neural language models' capability (as measured by training loss) increased smoothly in a power law relationship with number of parameters, quantity of training data, and computation used for training. These relationships were tested over a wide range of values (up to seven orders of magnitude) and no attenuation of the relationship was observed at the highest end of the range (including for network sizes up to trillions of parameters).

Application to downstream tasks
Between 2018 and 2020, the standard method for harnessing an LLM for a specific NLP task was to fine tune the model with additional task-specific training. It has subsequently been found that more powerful LLMs such as GPT-3 can solve tasks without additional training via "prompting" techniques, in which the problem to be solved is presented to the model as a text prompt, possibly with some textual examples of similar problems and their solutions.

Fine-tuning

Fine-tuning is the practice of modifying an existing pretrained language model by training it (in a supervised fashion) on a specific task (e.g. sentiment analysis, named entity recognition, or part-of-speech tagging). It is a form of transfer learning. It generally involves the introduction of a new set of weights connecting the final layer of the language model to the output of the downstream task. The original weights of the language model may be "frozen", such that only the new layer of weights connecting them to the output are learned during training. Alternatively, the original weights may receive small updates (possibly with earlier layers frozen).

Prompting

In the prompting paradigm, popularized by GPT-3, the problem to be solved is formulated via a text prompt, which the model must solve by providing a completion (via inference). In "few-shot prompting", the prompt includes a small number of examples of similar (problem, solution) pairs. For example, a sentiment analysis task of labelling the sentiment of a movie review could be prompted as follows:

Review: This movie stinks.
Sentiment: negative

Review: This movie is fantastic!
Sentiment:

If the model outputs "positive", then it has correctly solved the task. In zero-shot prompting, no solve examples are provided. An example of a zero-shot prompt for the same sentiment analysis task would be "The sentiment associated with the movie review 'This movie is fantastic!' is".

Few-shot performance of LLMs has been shown to achieve competitive results on NLP tasks, sometimes surpassing prior state-of-the-art fine-tuning approaches. Examples of such NLP tasks are translation, question answering, cloze tasks, unscrambling words, and using a novel word in a sentence. The creation and optimisation of such prompts is called prompt engineering and is now an active field of study.

Instruction tuning
Instruction tuning is a form of fine-tuning designed to facilitate more natural and accurate zero-shot prompting interactions. Given a text input, a pretrained language model will generate a completion which matches the distribution of text on which it was trained. A naive language model given the prompt "Write an essay about the main themes of Hamlet." might provide a completion such as "A late penalty of 10% per day will be applied to submissions received after March 17." In instruction tuning, the language model is trained on many examples of tasks formulated as natural language instructions, along with appropriate responses. Various techniques for instruction tuning have been applied in practice. OpenAI's InstructGPT protocol involves supervised fine-tuning on a dataset of human-generated (prompt, response) pairs, followed by reinforcement learning from human feedback (RLHF), in which a reward function was learned based on a dataset of human preferences. Another technique, "self-instruct", fine-tunes the language model on a training set of examples which are themselves generated by an LLM (bootstrapped from a small initial set of human-generated examples).

List of large language models

See also
 Chain-of-thought prompting
 Foundation models
 Reinforcement learning from human feedback

Notes

References

 
Deep learning
Natural language processing